Pavlo Rozenberg (born 22 July 1983 in Vinnytsia) is a German diver. He participates in the 1– and 3m platform competitions.

He won the bronze medal at the 1 m springboard at the 2001 World Aquatics Championships. He also won the bronze medal at the 2009 European Championships.

References

German male divers
Living people
1983 births
Olympic divers of Germany
Divers at the 2008 Summer Olympics
Sportspeople from Vinnytsia
21st-century German people